"It Just Comes Natural" is a song written by Marv Green and Jim Collins, and recorded by American country music singer George Strait.  It was released in October 2006 as the second single and title track from Strait's album It Just Comes Natural.  The song reached the top of the Billboard Hot Country Songs chart in February 2007.  The single became Strait's 42nd Billboard number-one single.

Content
The song is a mid-tempo, in which the narrator discusses things that naturally happen. He goes on to say that the love he has for his significant other comes naturally.

Chart positions

Year-end charts

References 

2006 singles
2006 songs
George Strait songs
Songs written by Jim Collins (singer)
Songs written by Marv Green
Song recordings produced by Tony Brown (record producer)
MCA Nashville Records singles